Sir Pierson John Dixon  (13 November 190422 April 1965) was a British diplomat and writer. He was known to be a firm believer in the value of diplomacy to solve international issues.

Career 
Dixon was the Principal Private Secretary to the Foreign Secretary between 1943 and 1948. He held the post of Ambassador to Czechoslovakia (1948–1950) and he was invested as Knight Commander of the Order of St. Michael and St. George in 1950. He later held the offices of Deputy Under-Secretary of State, Foreign Office (1950–1954) and Permanent Representative of the United Kingdom to the United Nations (1954–1960). He was involved during the Suez Crisis and Hungarian Uprising in 1956. He was invested as a Knight Grand Cross, Order of St. Michael and St. George in 1957 and served as the ambassador to France between 1960 and 1964.

Personal life

Dixon was educated at Bedford School and Pembroke College, Cambridge. He married Alexandra Ismene Atchley in 1928 in Chelsea; they had a son and two daughters. Their son, Piers, was a Conservative politician who represented Truro between 1970 and 1974 and wrote Double Diploma: The Life of Sir Pierson Dixon (1968).

Jennifer Nina Flora Mary Dixon married Peter Blaker, Baron Blaker, and Ann Anastasia Corinna Helena Dixon married James Hamilton, 4th Baron Hamilton of Dalzell.

His ashes are buried in the Dixon family grave on the west side of Highgate Cemetery.

Novels
He was an author of historical novels, notably writing about Justinian and Pauline Bonaparte.

 Farewell, Catullus (1953)
 The Glittering Horn: Secret Memoirs of the Court of Justinian (1958)
 Pauline: Napoleon's Favourite Sister (1964)

References

Further reading
N. Piers Ludlow, ‘Dixon, Sir Pierson John  (1904–1965)’, Oxford Dictionary of National Biography, Oxford University Press, Sept 2004; online ed., Jan 2008

People educated at Bedford School
Alumni of Pembroke College, Cambridge
Permanent Representatives of the United Kingdom to the United Nations
Knights Grand Cross of the Order of St Michael and St George
Ambassadors of the United Kingdom to France
1904 births
1965 deaths
Burials at Highgate Cemetery
Principal Private Secretaries to the Secretary of State for Foreign and Commonwealth Affairs
Ambassadors of the United Kingdom to Czechoslovakia
Members of HM Diplomatic Service
20th-century British novelists
British male novelists
20th-century British diplomats